The 1965 UC Davis Aggies football team represented the University of California, Davis as a member of the Far Western Conference (FWC) during the 1965 NCAA College Division football season. Led by third-year head coach Herb Schmalenberger, the Aggies compiled an overall record of 4–6 with a mark of 3–2 in conference play, placing third in the FWC. The team was outscored by its opponents 187 to 157 for the season. The Aggies played home games at Toomey Field in Davis, California.

The UC Davis sports teams were commonly called the "Cal Aggies" from 1924 until the mid 1970s.

Schedule

Notes

References

UC Davis
UC Davis Aggies football seasons
UC Davis Aggies football